Grandson was a district of the Canton of Vaud in Switzerland. The seat of the district was the town of Grandson.

On 1 September 2006 the district was dissolved and all the municipalities joined the new Jura-North Vaudois District.

Municipalities
Bonvillars
Bullet
Champagne
Concise
Corcelles-près-Concise
Fiez
Fontaines-sur-Grandson
Fontanezier
Giez
Grandevent
Grandson
Mauborget
Mutrux
Novalles
Onnens
Provence
Romairon
Sainte-Croix
Vaugondry
Villars-Burquin

References

Former districts of the canton of Vaud